The St. Catharines Athletics are a Junior "A" box lacrosse team from St. Catharines, Ontario, Canada.  The Athletics play in the OLA Junior A Lacrosse League.

History

The St. Catharines Athletics Jr.A squad has played in various arenas and under many different names in their history. They also had many years in which the team was defunct. However, the organization has been running successfully without danger of defunction since 1982.

St. Catharines Athletics 1877-1953, 1958-1961, 1982 to Present
St. Catharines Teepees 1954
St. Catharines Norsemen 1955-1956
St. Catharines Supertests 1964 - 1966
St. Catharines Lakesides 1967 - 1971
St. Catharines Legionaires 1972 - 1977

Minto Cup championships

During their history, the team has won six Minto Cup championships (1947, 1950, 1990, 1991, 2001, 2003.)

1947 defeated the Vancouver Jr. Burrards 3 games to 1 - played @ Haig Bowl in St. Catharines, Ontario.
1950 defeated the Vancouver Jr. Burradrs 3 games to 0 - played in Vancouver, British Columbia and the Winnipeg All-Stars 2 games to 0 - played in Winnipeg, Manitoba.
1990 defeated the Richmond Outlaws 2 games to 1 - played @ Queen's Park Arena in New Westminster, B.C.
1991 defeated the Victoria Eagles 4 games to 1 - played @ Garden City Arena in St. Catharines, Ontario
2001 defeated the Burnaby Jr. A Lakers 4 games to 2 - played @ Garden City Arena in St. Catharines, Ontario
2003 defeated the Burnaby Jr. A Lakers 2 games to 1 - played @ Waterloo Memorial Recreation Complex in Waterloo, Ontario

NLL players

Many St. Catharines lacrosse players who played for the Athletics have gone on to successfully play in the National Lacrosse League, such as:

Ian Llord - Buffalo Bandits
Sean Greenhalgh - Buffalo Bandits
Billy Dee Smith - Buffalo Bandits
Mark Steenhuis - Buffalo Bandits
Matt Skinner- Toronto Rock
Steve Priolo - Buffalo Bandits
Corey Quinn - Buffalo Bandits
Geoff McNulty - Calgary Roughnecks
Joel McCready - Rochester Knighthawks
Ian Rubel - Rochester Knighthawks
Steve Toll - Rochester Knighthawks (all time leader in assists (356) and points (608))
Matt Vinc - Rochester Knighthawks
Pat McCready - Rochester Knighthawks
Thomas Hajek - Philadelphia Wings
Craig Conn - Washington Stealth
Jon Sullivan - Minnesota Swarm
Brad Favero - Minnesota Swarm
Corey Small - Edmonton Rush
Randy Mearns - retired.
Tyson Bell - Calgary Roughnecks
Latrell Harris - Toronto Rock
Jeff Wittig - Colorado Mammoth
Holden Garlent - Saskatchewan Rush
Alex Pace - Philadelphia Wings
Thomas Whitty - Rochester Knighthawks

There is also a notable number of players outside of St. Catharines who have gone on to successful careers after playing for the Athletics. Players included are:

Mike Accursi - Rochester Knighthawks (two seasons)
Luke Wiles - Washington Stealth (one season)
Athan Iannucci - Philadelphia Wings (one season)
Mike Hominuck - Toronto Rock
Rory Glaves  - Edmonton Rush
Frank Resetarits - Buffalo Bandits
Joe Resetarits - Buffalo Bandits
 Brett Bucktooth - Buffalo Bandits (one season)
Darris Kilgour - Buffalo Bandits  (Retired from playing, now head coach of the Bandits)
 Cam Bomberry - retired
 Tyson Leies - retired.
 Brian Lemon - Baltimore Thunder, Detroit Turbos (Current National Lacrosse League Vice President of Operations)

Recently drafted players (2020) include: 

Laine Hruska - 13th Overall (Georgia)
Owen Friesen - 48th Overall (Halifax)
John Kit - 74th Overall (Philadelphia)
Sam LeClair - 86th Overall (Colorado)

Season-by-season results

Note: GP = Games played, W = Wins, L = Losses, T = Ties, Pts = Points, GF = Goals for, GA = Goals against

References

External links
Athletics Webpage
The Bible of Lacrosse
Unofficial OLA Page
Gardell's History of the Athletics

Ontario Lacrosse Association teams
Sport in St. Catharines
Lacrosse teams in Ontario
1877 establishments in Ontario
Lacrosse clubs established in 1877